Quthing is an impact crater on Mars.  It was named by the IAU in 2013 after Quthing District in Lesotho.

References 

Impact craters on Mars